Kian Dasht (also Romanized as Kīan Dasht and KianDasht) is a village in Hesar Kharvan Rural District, Mohammadiyeh District, Alborz County, Qazvin Province, Iran. At the 2006 census, its population was 94, in 33 families.

References 

Populated places in Alborz County